It Mek (sometimes appearing as "A It Mek" or German language "It Miek") was a 1969 hit song by the Jamaican musicians Desmond Dekker & the Aces. After being re-released in June 1969, the single reached number 7 in the UK Singles Chart. The track was written by Dekker (under his real name of Desmond Dacres) and his record producer, Leslie Kong, and was recorded in Jamaica with the brass accompaniment added in the UK. It spent eleven weeks in the UK chart, and by September 1970 had sold over a million copies worldwide. A gold record was presented by Ember Records, the distributors of Dekker's recordings.

The song's title is Jamaican patois meaning "that's why" or "that's the reason." According to the liner notes for the Dekker compilation album Rockin' Steady – The Best of Desmond Dekker the phrase was also used as a schoolyard taunt roughly meaning "that's what you get." This was the sense used in the song's lyrics, which metaphorically tell of the problems that happens when someone (such as a lover) goes too far.

Charts

Weekly charts

Year-end charts

References

External links
[ Allmusic.com song review]

1968 songs
1969 singles
Reggae songs
Songs written by Leslie Kong
Songs written by Desmond Dekker
Song recordings produced by Leslie Kong
Desmond Dekker songs